Oliver Riot is a R&B/Soul duo composed of Benjamin and Alexander Moore, identical twins from Albuquerque, New Mexico, USA.

Early life 
Ben and Alex Moore lived in Peru until the age of 5, when their family moved to New Mexico. When they were 14, they started playing Gypsy Jazz together in the style of Django Reinhardt at restaurants, coffee shops, bars, breweries, and street corners in Albuquerque. They purchased their first car, a green Ford Explorer, with the money they received from gigs and began writing their own music at the age of 16. Two years later, the brothers drove to Los Angeles in that Ford Explorer to play music.

Career 
Shortly following their move to LA, Oliver Riot took home first place in the Grammy's annual "Rock The Mic Competition", showcasing emerging California artists, and were awarded studio time with legendary producer, Mike Clink (Guns N' Roses, Metallica, Eddie Money, etc.).

Oliver Riot released their debut EP, Hallucinate, in November 2015. The album was produced in its entirety by Real Miilk in the back room of a Korean Church. Alex lived in his van parked outside of the church while creating the record, and both brothers continued to do so while recording the duo's next album. Often compared to James Vincent McMorrow, James Blake, and Passenger, Indie TrendSetters says, "Oliver Riot is a dazzling point of unnoticed incandescence, an ineffable aurora devoid of deserving admirers, a true work of underground art that makes mainstream music look like superficial sham."

Based in Los Angeles, the twins finished their second highly anticipated EP entitled Neurosis, which was released in part in December 2016. Oliver Riot is represented by Paradigm Talent Agency.

After taking a musical break, the duo released a single entitled Nervous in October 2019.

Discography 
EPs
 Hallucinate (November 4, 2015, Independent)
 Neurosis (January 20, 2017, Independent)
 Nervous (October 16, 2019, Independent)
 Faint (July 23, 2021, Independent)
 Cold (September 17, 2021, Independent)

References

External links

Twin musical duos
American rhythm and blues musical groups
Identical twin males
Male musical duos